Thuxton is a small village and former civil parish, now in the parish of Garvestone, Reymerston and Thuxton, in the Breckland district, in the county of Norfolk, England. It is 6 miles north west of Wymondham and 5 miles south east of Dereham. In 1931 the parish had a population of 83. The village retains a church, St Paul's, which has a monthly service and special events. On the 1st of April 1935 the parish was merged with Thuxton to form "Garveston", later the parish was renamed to "Garvestone, Reymerston and Thuxton".

The village is located just off the B1135 Wymondham to Dereham road, and is served by a station on the Mid-Norfolk Railway heritage line.  The railway station waiting rooms have been converted into holiday accommodation

Thuxton is also listed as a deserted medieval linear village, with twenty-nine tofts having been located.

References

Notes

External links

Villages in Norfolk
Former civil parishes in Norfolk
Breckland District